A total solar eclipse occurred on October 27, 1780. A solar eclipse occurs when the Moon passes between Earth and the Sun, thereby totally or partly obscuring the image of the Sun for a viewer on Earth. A total solar eclipse occurs when the Moon's apparent diameter is larger than the Sun's, blocking all direct sunlight, turning day into darkness. Totality occurs in a narrow path across Earth's surface, with the partial solar eclipse visible over a surrounding region thousands of kilometres wide.

Observations

During the American Revolutionary War, the first American solar eclipse expedition was organized and sent out from Harvard College in Massachusetts. A special immunity agreement was negotiated with the British to allow the scientists to work unharmed. The Harvard expedition, after all their efforts, missed the eclipse because they chose a site outside the path of totality. Modern analysis of this embarrassing incident for embryonic American science blame Samuel Williams for miscalculating the path of totality.

Related eclipses 
It is a part of solar Saros 120.

See also 
 List of solar eclipses visible from the United Kingdom 1000–2090 AD

Notes

References
 NASA chart graphics
 Googlemap
 NASA Besselian elements
 Observations of a Solar Eclipse, October 27, 1780, Made at St. John's Island, by Mess'rs. Clarke and Wright, by Joseph Peters 1783 American Academy of Arts & Sciences.
 A Memoir, Containing Observations of a Solar Eclipse of October 27, 1780 by Joseph Willard, 1783 
 Where Did the 1780 Eclipse Go? Rothschild, Robert F., Sky and Telescope, 63:558, 1982

1780 10 2
1780 in science
1780 10 27